Trafalgar  is a Canadian rural community located inland from Nova Scotia's Eastern Shore. While it is named after the Battle of Trafalgar, it is not pronounced the same as Trafalgar England.  Emphasis is on the first syllable traf'-el-GAR.

It is located at the boundaries of Pictou County, Guysborough County (specifically the Municipality of the District of St. Mary's) and Halifax County (specifically the Halifax Regional Municipality).

Trafalgar is located on Route 374 at the north end of the Liscomb Sanctuary and an associated forest fire-fighting station.

Porcupine Lake-Trafalgar Forest Fire
During the summer of 1976, a small brush fire of unknown ignition broke out with the fire quickly spreading to surrounding wilderness. Pilot William Burtt of Dominion Pegasus helicopters was dispatched from Cape Breton Island. Burtt, flying a Bell 206 jet ranger, selflessly provided relentless aerial attack. Through his diligent & heroic actions, Burtt was able to save the lives of a boy scout troop trapped by the fire.

References
 HRM Civic Address Map

External links
 Nova Scotia Transportation Webcam
HRM Communities

Communities in Halifax, Nova Scotia
Communities in Guysborough County, Nova Scotia
Communities in Pictou County
General Service Areas in Nova Scotia